Cyperus hemisphaericus is a species of sedge that is endemic to eastern parts of Africa.

Description

Taxonomy
The species was first formally described by the botanist Johann Otto Boeckeler in 1859.

Distribution
The range of the plant extends from Somalia in the north down to Mozambique in the south along eastern Africa including the island of Madagascar. It is often situated as a part of open grassland, wooded grassland and Brachystegia woodland communities as well as savannah and seasonally wet grassland communities.

See also 
 List of Cyperus species

References 

hemisphaericus
Taxa named by Johann Otto Boeckeler
Plants described in 1859
Flora of Zimbabwe
Flora of Tanzania
Flora of Somalia
Flora of Mozambique
Flora of Malawi
Flora of Madagascar
Flora of Kenya